The 1976 South American Championships was a men's tennis tournament played on outdoor clay courts in Buenos Aires, Argentina that was part of the 1976 Commercial Union Assurance Grand Prix and held from 22 November through 28 November 1976. First-seeded Guillermo Vilas won the singles title.

Finals

Singles

 Guillermo Vilas defeated  Jaime Fillol 6–2, 6–2, 6–3
 It was Vilas's 6th title of the year and the 27th of his career.

Doubles
 Carlos Kirmayr /  Tito Vázquez defeated  Ricardo Cano /  Belus Prajoux 6–4, 7–5
 It was Kirmayr's 4th title of the year and the 4th of his career. It was Vasquez's only title of the year and the 2nd of his career.

References

External links 
 ITF tournament edition details
 ATP tournament profile

South American Championships
South American Championships (Tennis), 1976
ATP Buenos Aires
South Am
Davis